Toppatakkeja ja Toledon terästä (1994) is a concept album by the Finnish rock group YUP. It is considered as one of the band's more progressive efforts, combining many genres of music.

Track listing
All songs written by Tynkkynen & Martikainen, with lyrics by Martikainen.

 "Tyttö jota rakastan" – 3:18 "The Girl I Love"
 "Minä olen myyrä" – 4:45 "I Am A Mole"
 "Huonot uutiset" – 3:04 "The Bad News"
 "Älä astu kauppiaan päälle" – 5:30 "Don't Step On The Merchant"
 "Pää puhuu" – 2:52 "The Head Speaks"
 "Toppatakkeja ja Toledon terästä" – 5:16 "Guilted Jackets and Steel Of Toledo"
 "Mitä elämän jälkeen?" – 4:39 "What's After Life?"
 "Soljan käsittely" – 4:03 "Handling of Solja"
 "Kuonamagneetti" – 3:39 "Drossmagnet"
 "Taivaiden maisterit" – 7:15 "Masters of the Heavens"

Personnel
Musicians
 Jussi Hyyrynen - guitars, vocals
 Tommi Kärkkäinen - keyboards, percussions, vocals
 Janne Mannonen - drums, vocals
 Jarkko Martikainen - vocals, guitars, illustrations
 Valtteri Tynkkynen - bass guitar, vocals
 Granito Choir, P. Tynkkynen - vocals (6)
 V. Hyrskykari - saxophone (9)
 H. Kärkkäinen - vocals (3)
 A. Toikka - additional percussions (1, 6)
 T. Wilska - accommodations, vocals (8)

Production
 J. Viitanen - producer, engineer, mixing, mastering
 M. Jussila - mastering

References

YUP (band) albums
1994 albums